"Sunday (The Day Before My Birthday)" is a song by American electronica musician Moby. It was released as the fourth single from his sixth studio album 18 on February 24, 2003. The song features samples of American singer and Sugar Hill Records founder Sylvia Robinson's song "Sunday".

Music video 
The music video for "Sunday (The Day Before My Birthday)" was directed by Style Wars, who previously directed the video for Moby's "In This World". It acts as a sequel to the "In This World" video, featuring the same alien characters from the video returning to Earth, this time being recognized on the Hollywood Walk of Fame. They become renowned celebrities and enjoy major success, including a television series. The end of the video shows the aliens piloting their spacecraft back to their much less stressful home planet.

Track listing 
 CD single 
 "Sunday (The Day Before My Birthday)"  – 3:22
 "And I Know" – 4:45
 "ISS" – 8:45
 "Sunday (The Day Before My Birthday)"  – 3:25
 CD single 
 "Sunday (The Day Before My Birthday)"  – 3:46
 "Sunday (The Day Before My Birthday)"  – 5:40
 "In My Heart"  – 7:33
 12-inch single 
 "Sunday (The Day Before My Birthday)"  – 9:05
 "Sunday (The Day Before My Birthday)"  – 7:31

Charts

References

External links 
 

Moby songs
2003 singles
Songs written by Moby
Mute Records singles
2002 songs